The Broken Melody may refer to:

 The Broken Melody (1916 film), a silent British film directed by Cavendish Morton
 The Broken Melody (1919 film), a silent American film directed by William P.S. Earle
 The Broken Melody (1929 film), a silent British film directed by Fred Paul
 The Broken Melody (1934 film), a British musical drama film directed by Bernard Vorhaus
 The Broken Melody (1937 film), an Australian drama film directed by Ken G. Hall
 The Broken Melody, an 1896 Broadway play by Herbert Keen and James T. Tanner
 The Broken Melody, a composition by Auguste van Biene for the play